Noel is a city in McDonald County, Missouri, United States, along the Elk River. The population was 1,832 at the 2010 census. The county adjoins the border with Northwest Arkansas.

History
A post office called Noel has been in operation since 1886. The community was named for Clark Wallace "C.W." and William Jasper "W.J." Noel; brothers, stockmen, and owners of a saw mill.

Noel later capitalized on its Christmas-themed name, along with North Pole, Alaska, Christmas, Michigan, Santa Claus, Indiana, and Bethlehem, Pennsylvania. Each year, tens of thousands of Christmas cards and letters are sent to the USPS Noel Post Office during the holiday season to be stamped with a postmark reading, Noel, Mo. - "The Christmas City in the Ozark Vacation Land". This practice became popular by the late 1940s when Kate Smith, a radio and television singer, began telling the "Noel Story" during her broadcasts. Most of the year, area residents pronounce Noel as rhyming with mole, in honor of the town's namesake, Bridges Noel. The town was founded after the Kansas City, Pittsburg, and Gulf Railroad arrived.

Noel is home to a Tyson Foods plant, where chicken is processed for human consumption. By 2010, between 400 and 500 Somali refugees, and 60 and 70 Sudanese refugees, out of 1,800 residents, lived in the town, most of whom worked for Tyson Foods. In 2011, 130 Muslim employees stopped working temporarily after they were allegedly discouraged from praying five times a day for fear of low productivity. Tyson Foods later released a statement dismissing it as a cross-cultural misunderstanding.

On August 3, 1969, a freight train exploded while passing through Noel, spraying fragments of metal through houses and buildings over a six-block area.  One person was killed, and 40 others injured.

A mosque was established in 2009, and an African Grocery Store which sells headscarves and rugs in 2010; both are located on the Main Street. In 2017, the mayor, John Lafley, said that the Muslim refugees "want to practice their Sharia law here, and that's one thing the city won't tolerate".

On December 28, 2020, an early morning fire broke out at the African Grocery. It was destroyed. The fire spread to the adjacent mosque as well as other businesses. One person inside the store suffered extensive burns from which they died. 

A few days after the fire, the Islamic Society of Joplin launched a fundraising campaign to find a new home for the mosque. The goal was met, raising $100,480.

Geography
Noel is located at  (36.543361, -94.486238).

Demographics

2010 census
As of the census of 2010, there were 1,832 people, 616 households, and 428 families residing in the village. The racial makeup of the village was 56.6% White, 5.0% African American, 2.4% Native American, 0.1% Asian, 2.9% Pacific Islander, 29.4% from other races, and 3.5% from two or more races. Hispanic or Latino of any race were 49.7% of the population.

There were 616 households, of which 45.1% had children under the age of 18 living with them, 41.2% were married couples living together, 18.3% had a female householder with no husband present, 9.9% had a male householder with no wife present, and 30.5% were non-families. 22.4% of all households were made up of individuals, and 6.4% had someone living alone who was 65 years of age or older. The average household size was 2.97 and the average family size was 3.43.

The median age in the village was 28.5 years. 31.8% of residents were under the age of 18; 11.2% were between the ages of 18 and 24; 30% were from 25 to 44; 20% were from 45 to 64; and 6.9% were 65 years of age or older. The gender makeup of the village was 49.3% male and 50.7% female.

2000 census
As of the census of 2000, there were 1,480 people, 566 households, and 354 families residing in the city. The population density was 739.7 people per square mile (285.7/km). There were 630 housing units at an average density of 314.9 per square mile (121.6/km). The racial makeup of the city was 71.42% White, 0.34% African American, 2.16% Native American, 0.07% Asian, 0.07% Pacific Islander, 22.97% from other races, and 2.97% from two or more races. Hispanic or Latino of any race were 36.49% of the population.

There were 566 households, out of which 31.8% had children under the age of 18 living with them, 44.9% were married couples living together, 10.8% had a female householder with no husband present, and 37.3% were non-families. 29.3% of all households were made up of individuals, and 9.2% had someone living alone who was 65 years of age or older. The average household size was 2.61 and the average family size was 3.25.

In the village the population was spread out, with 27.3% under the age of 18, 12.3% from 18 to 24, 28.5% from 25 to 44, 20.6% from 45 to 64, and 11.3% who were 65 years of age or older. The median age was 32 years. For every 100 females, there were 109.9 males. For every 100 females age 18 and over, there were 112.6 males.

The median income for a household in the village was $27,386, and the median income for a family was $32,159. Males had a median income of $18,819 versus $16,848 for females. The per capita income for the village was $11,166. About 15.4% of families and 21.0% of the population were below the poverty line, including 29.8% of those under age 18 and 13.8% of those age 65 or over.

Education
Public education in Noel is administered by McDonald County R-1 School District.

Noel has a public library, the Noel Community Branch Library.

See also
McDonald Territory
Santa Claus, Indiana
North Pole, Alaska
Christmas, Florida

References

External links
 Welcome to Noel, Missouri website

Cities in McDonald County, Missouri
Cities in Missouri
Somali-American history